Defending champion Daniel Nestor and his partner Nenad Zimonjić defeated Bob and Mike Bryan in the final, 7–6(7–3), 6–2 to win the doubles tennis title at the 2008 Tennis Masters Cup.

Mark Knowles and Nestor were the reigning champions, but did not compete together. Knowles partnered Mahesh Bhupathi, but they were eliminated in the round-robin stage.

Seeds

Draw

Finals

Red group
Standings are determined by: 1. number of wins; 2. number of matches; 3. in two-players-ties, head-to-head records; 4. in three-players-ties, percentage of sets won, or of games won; 5. steering-committee decision.

Gold group
Standings are determined by: 1. number of wins; 2. number of matches; 3. in two-players-ties, head-to-head records; 4. in three-players-ties, percentage of sets won, or of games won; 5. steering-committee decision.

External links
Draw

Doubles